Life Is Good on the Open Road is the eighth studio album by Minnesota-based bluegrass group Trampled by Turtles, released on May 4, 2018.

Critical reception 
Rolling Stone writer Luke Levenson commented, "Life Is Good on the Open Road balances delicate ballads and loose, upbeat romps, with frontman Dave Simonett's strident voice connecting the dots."

Track listing

Charts

References

2018 albums
BanjoDad Records albums
Trampled by Turtles albums